Events from the year 1703 in France

Incumbents
 Monarch – Louis XIV

Events
 February 20–March 10 – War of the Spanish Succession: Siege of Kehl – French forces under the command of the Duc de Villars capture the fortress of the Holy Roman Empire at Kehl, opposite Strasbourg on the Rhine.
 March 19–May 15 – War of the Spanish Succession: Siege of Guadeloupe – An English expeditionary force fails to capture the island capital Basse-Terre in the French West Indies.
 March 21 – Jeanne Guyon is freed in Paris after more than seven years imprisonment for heresy in the Bastille.
 September 7 – War of the Spanish Succession: The town of Breisach is retaken for France by Camille d'Hostun, duc de Tallard.
 October 11 – Nine Roman Catholic residents of the village of Sainte-Cécile-d'Andorge are massacred by a mob of more than 800 Huguenot Protestants, the Camisards.  A reprisal against Protestants in the nearby village of Branoux is made less than three weeks later.
 October 30 – More than 47 Huguenots in the village of Branoux-les-Taillades are massacred by Roman Catholic vigilantes in reprisal for the October 11 attack in Sainte-Cécile, 3.3 km away.
 November 15 – War of the Spanish Succession: Battle of Speyerbach (in modern-day Germany) – The French defeat a German relief army, allowing the French to take the besieged town of Landau two days later, for which Tallard is made a Marshal of France.
 November 19 – The Man in the Iron Mask dies in the Bastille.

Births
3 January – Daniel-Charles Trudaine, administrator and civil engineer (died 1769)
8 January – André Levret, obstetrician (died 1780)
5 January – Paul d'Albert de Luynes, archbishop (died 1788)
15 January – Henriette Louise de Bourbon, princess (died 1772)
22 January – Antoine Walsh, slave trader and Jacobite (died 1763)
31 January – André-Joseph Panckoucke, author and bookseller (died 1753)
3 February – Jean Philippe de Bela, military figure and Basque writer and historian (died 1796)
4 February – Jean Saas, historian and bibliographer (died 1774)
3 March – Charles-Joseph Natoire, rococo painter (died 1777)
4 March – Nicolas René Berryer, magistrate and politician (died 1762)
8 April – Benoît-Joseph Boussu, violin maker (died 1773)
10 April – Pierre Daubenton, lawyer (died 1776)
18 May – Jean Daullé, engraver (died 1763)
20 May – René Lièvre de Besançon, archer (died 1739)
21 June – Joseph Lieutaud, physician (died 1780)
4 August – Louis, Duke of Orléans, member of the royal family (died 1752)
15 September – Guillaume-François Rouelle, chemist (d. 1770)
29 September
 François Boucher, painter (died 1770)
 François Fresneau de La Gataudière, botanist and scientist (died 1770)
16 October – Joachim Faiguet de Villeneuve, economist (died 1781)
28 October – Antoine Deparcieux, mathematician (died 1768)
23 November – Louise Levesque, femme de lettres (died 1743)
25 November – Jean-François Séguier, astronomer and botanist (died 1784)
Charles Clémencet, Benedictine historian (died 1778)

Deaths

16 May – Charles Perrault, author (born 1628)
26 May – Louis-Hector de Callière, politician, governor of Montreal (born in 1648)
26 July – Gérard Audran, engraver (born 1640)
30 November – Nicolas de Grigny, organist and composer

See also

References

1700s in France